The Agassi–Sampras rivalry was a tennis rivalry between Andre Agassi and Pete Sampras, who were both ranked world No. 1 during the 1990s. Sampras held the world's top ranking for (a then-record) 286 weeks while Agassi held it for 101 weeks. With contrasting styles and temperaments, they played each other 34 times from 1989 through 2002, with the head-to-head finishing 20-14 favoring Sampras. It has been named as one of the greatest tennis rivalries of all time.

In Grand Slam tournaments, they played in five finals, with Sampras winning four.  They met for the first time in a Grand Slam final at the 1990 US Open, with Agassi the favorite because of his superior ranking even though Sampras had defeated former world No. 1 players Ivan Lendl and John McEnroe en route to the final.  Sampras defeated Agassi in straight sets.

In one of their matches, at the 2001 US Open quarter-final, Sampras won with the score of 6–7(7–9), 7–6(7–2), 7–6(7–2), 7–6(7–5); throughout the match, no player broke the other's serve. The last match in their rivalry came at the 2002 US Open final. It was their first meeting in the final since Sampras won in 1995. Sampras went on to win the match in four sets. This was Sampras's last career match, as he announced his retirement from the game a year later at the 2003 US Open. Agassi retired in 2006 after 20 years on the tour.

From their first ATP match to their 1995 US Open final match, their head-to-head was tied 8–8. From their 1995 US Open final match to 1999, their head-to-head was 9–3 in favor of Sampras. Agassi has often said that the 1995 US Open loss was a powerful blow to him that took him years to recover from; amid this and other psychological issues he subsequently plummeted to world No. 141, and it marked a significant shift in their rivalry. From 2000 to their last match in 2002, their head-to-head was tied at 3–3.

At the time of their retirements, Sampras held the all-time record for most men's Grand Slam titles, with 14. This broke Björn Borg's record of 11 titles won in the Open Era, as well as the 12 by Roy Emerson from before the Open Era. On the other hand, Agassi, who claimed 8 Grand Slam titles, was ranked joint third for most titles in the Open Era, and joint fifth all-time at the time of his retirement. Agassi was the second man after Rod Laver to win the singles Career Grand Slam in the Open Era and one of then-five (currently eight) overall. By winning the gold medal in men's singles at the 1996 Olympics, he became the first male player to achieve a Career Golden Slam in singles tennis. The Career Grand Slam proved elusive for Sampras, as he was unable to find significant success on the serve-neutralizing clay courts, reaching only one French Open semi-final in his career.

Agassi also held the then-record for most ATP Masters Series (AMS) shields (since 1990) with 17. Also, Agassi has been called the best service returner in the history of the game.

In retirement, Agassi and Sampras have found bonds to continue their friendship on a deeper level.

Head-to-head

Singles (34)
Agassi 14 – Sampras 20

Breakdown of their rivalry 
 All matches: (34) Sampras 20–14
 All finals: Sampras 9–7
 Hard courts: Sampras 11–9
 Grass courts: Sampras 2–0
 Clay courts: Agassi 3–2
 Carpet courts: Sampras 5–2
 Masters Series matches: Tied 5–5
 Masters Series finals: Agassi 3–2
 Grand Slam matches: Sampras 6–3
 Grand Slam finals: Sampras 4–1
 Year-end championships matches: Sampras 4–2 
 Year-end championships finals: Sampras 1–0

Performance timeline comparison

Grand Slam tournaments 

 Bold = players met during this tournament

1986–1991

1992–1997

1998–2002

ATP rankings

Year-end ranking timeline

Career evolution 
Agassi and Sampras were born fifteen and a half months apart. Agassi's birthday is April 29, 1970, while Sampras's is August 12, 1971. A different viewpoint of their career evolution is offered by taking the season they ended with an age of 16 as starting point, and comparing their accomplishments at the same age. For instance in 1996, Agassi finished the season being 26 years old and holding 3 Grand Slam titles.

Combined singles performance timeline (best result)

See also
List of tennis rivalries

References

Further reading
 

Videos
1990 US Open Final part 1
2000 Australian Open semifinal 4th set tiebreaker
2002 US Open Final Highlights – Sampras' and Agassi's final match

Andre Agassi
Tennis rivalries
Sports rivalries in the United States